Julius Dawkins is a former American football wide receiver in the National Football League (NFL) and Arena Football League (AFL). He was drafted by the Buffalo Bills in the 12th round of the 1983 NFL Draft. As a college football player with the University of Pittsburgh Panthers, he set a Pitt record with four touchdown catches in a game. Dawkins also played for the Pittsburgh Gladiators.

College career
In his junior year at Pitt in 1981, he was an Associated Press first-team All-American after hauling in 46 receptions for 767 yards and 16 touchdowns. College Football News ranked Dawkins the fourth best receiver in the history of the University of Pittsburgh.

Professional career

Buffalo Bills
Dawkins was drafted by the Buffalo Bills in the 12th round of the 1983 NFL Draft. In two years with the team he started five of 27 games, recording 32 receptions or 418 yards and three touchdowns.

Pittsburgh Gladiators
Dawkins played two years in the Arena Football League for the Pittsburgh Gladiators in 1988 and 1990. During the two years he had 90 receptions for 1,334 yards and 30 touchdowns as a receiver and 21 tackles and three interceptions as a linebacker.

References

Living people
American football wide receivers
American football linebackers
Pittsburgh Panthers football players
Buffalo Bills players
Pittsburgh Gladiators players
Players of American football from Pennsylvania
People from Monessen, Pennsylvania
Year of birth missing (living people)